Ahtra  is an Estonian island in the Baltic Sea.

See also
 List of islands of Estonia

Estonian islands in the Baltic
Tõstamaa Parish
Articles lacking sources from June 2009
All articles lacking sources